Qir and Karzin County (Shahrestan Qir va Karzin) is located in Fars province, Iran. The capital of the county is Qir. At the 2006 census, the county's population was 61,432, in 13,246 households. The following census in 2011 counted 65,045 people, in 16,906 households. At the 2016 census, the county's population was 71,203, in 20,508 households.

Administrative divisions

The population history and structural changes of Qir and Karzin County's administrative divisions over three consecutive censuses are shown in the following table. The latest census shows two districts, five rural districts, and five cities.

References

 

Counties of Fars Province